WWVU-FM is a College formatted broadcast radio station licensed to Morgantown, West Virginia, serving Eastern Monongalia County, West Virginia.  WWVU-FM is owned and operated by West Virginia University.

Known as U92 The Moose, WWVU-FM broadcasts at 91.7FM, and broadcasts from 284 Prospect St, Morgantown, WV 26505. The station broadcasts college and alternative rock, as well as jazz, punk, hip hop, metal, and other genres, as well as several WVU sports.

History

WWVU-FM first went on the airwaves in 1982 when it opened its studios at the Mountainlair. Affectionately known as "The Moose," U92 has been a hands-on training ground for students interested in programming music, producing digital content in state-of-the-art studios, providing live Mountaineer sports coverage, or reporting on local and state news. The station is completely student-run and while there is a professional staff member who oversees the operation, it is up to the student directors and volunteer staff to create all content. U92 is currently managed by WVU Student Media, and broadcasts alternative rock and college rock in its "regular rotation." The station currently has programs dedicated to jazz, metal, punk, hip hop, and other genres, and broadcasts several WVU sports including women's soccer, women's basketball, baseball, hockey and more.

CMJ Accolades
In 2015, WWVU-FM won the College Music Journal Station of the Year award.  WWVU's Music Director, Elizabeth McIntyre, won Music Director of the Year.  Hip-Hop Director, Cody Roane, won the Specialty Show Director of the Year award.  Winning such honors places WWVU on record as one of the best college radio stations in North America.

CMJ Nominations
In 2015, WWVU was nominated for six College Music Journal awards.  The six categories were Station of the Year, Music Director of the Year (Elizabeth McIntyre), Specialty Music Director of the Year (Cody Roane - Hip-Hop), Most Creative, Small Station Big Idea, and Most Improved.

WWVU was nominated for three College Music Journal awards in 2013.  One for Music Director of the Year (Jimmy Fortuna), one for Best Community Resource and Biggest Improvement.

See also
 List of radio stations in West Virginia

References

External links
 U-92 Online
 

West Virginia University
WVU-FM
WVU-FM